Fumarylacetoacetase is an enzyme that in humans is encoded by the FAH gene located on chromosome 15. The FAH gene is thought to be involved in the catabolism of the amino acid phenylalanine in humans.

Function 
Fumarylacetoacetate hydrolase (FAH) is a protein homodimer which cleaves fumarylacetoacetate at its carbon-carbon bond during a hydrolysis reaction. As a critical enzyme in phenylalanine and tyrosine metabolism,  4-Fumarylacetoacetate hydrolase catalyzes the final step in the catabolism of 4-fumarylacetoacetate and water into acetoacetate, fumarate, and H+ respectively. These hydrolytic reactions are essential during aromatic amino acid human metabolism. Furthermore, FAH does not share known protein sequence homologs with other nucleotides or amino acids.

Reaction mechanism 

The active site of FAH contains  Ca2+ which acts to bind the substrate and a Glu-His-Water catalytic triad functions where  the imidaxole ring of His133 activates a nucleophilic water molecule to attack the carbon-carbon bond of fumarylactoacetate thus forming fumarate and acetoacetate. Similar to Phenylalanine-associated pathways, the reaction molecular basis is critical in mammalian metabolism, as evidenced by the observed liver enzyme activity in FAH deficiency during hereditary tyrosinemia type 1. In humans, this enzyme is mainly expressed in the liver. FAH is among the amino acid hydroxylases. Tyrosine aminotransferase (TAT), 4-hydroxyphenylpyruvate dioxygenase (HPD), homogentisate 1,2-dioxygenase (HGD), phenylalanine-4-hydroxylase (PAH), maleylacetoacetate isomerase (GSTZ1),and other amino acid catabolic hydroxylases are coupled in the biological process of hydroxylases as well. The FAH subpathway constitutes a part of the main amino-acid L-phenylalanine degradation.  For ingested phenylalanine, turnover for FAH protein synthesis is directly linked to treatment based methodology.

Mutations 
The activity of human liver fumarylacetoacetate fumarylhydrolase has been determined with fumarylacetoacetate as the substrate. As an inborn error of metabolism, Tyrosinemia type I stems from a deficiency in the enzymatic catabolic pathway of fumarylacetoacetate hydrolase (FAH).  Currently, the mutations reported include silent mutations, amino acid replacements within single base substitutions, nonsense codons, and splicing defects. Mutations spread across the FAH gene observes clusters of amino acid residues such as alanine and aspartic acid residues. Hereditary tyrosinemia type 1 is a metabolic disorder with an autosomal recessive mode of inheritance. The disease is caused by a deficiency of fumarylacetoacetate hydrolase (FAH), the last enzyme in the degradation pathway of tyrosine. Hereditary tyrosinemia type 1 manifests in either an acute or a chronic form. However, symptoms may appear in heterozygote mutations in the FAH gene as documented in case of a 12‐year‐old American boy with chronic tyrosinemia type 1. Specifically, maternal alleles for codon 234 exhibit this mutation which changes a tryptophan to a glycine. This possibly suggests HT1 missense mutations also inhibiting enzymatic activity. This is also attributed to observed clustering between amino acid residue active sites 230 and 250 among hundreds of other mutations in the FAH gene. Currently, FAH gene correlation with HT1 does not associate clinical phenotype with genotype.

Symptoms 
Possible disease symptom is the development of Hereditary tyrosinemia type 1 (HT1). Caused by the lack of fumarylacetoacetate hydrolase (FAH), the last enzyme of the tyrosine catabolic pathway, HT 1 is inherited as a rare autosomal recessive disease with a prevalence in Europe of 1 : 50000. However, in isolated parts of Quebec's provinces, the frequency can be as high as 1 : 2000 with a carrier rate of 1:20 possibly due to a single founder mutation. FAH deficiency leads to an accumulation of alkylafing metabolites that cause damage to the liver. The disorder presents as an acute, chronic or intermediate mild phenotype. The acute form manifests itself within the first half year and is characterized by liver failure, renal damage, and possibly death in the first year of life. The chronic form has an age of onset of more than one year after birth; rickets and progressive liver disease often lead to the development of hepatocellular carcinoma. Other symptoms can include renal tubular injury, hepatic necrosis, episodic weakness, seizures. Renal Fanconi syndrome and Porphyric crises are also cited in addition to liver and renal damage.

Treatment 
Currently, there is no cure for tyrosinemia type 1. Diagnosed individuals need special dietary restriction all throughout life for the amino acids, phenylalanine and tyrosine. Affected individuals may also be treated with a FDA-approved medication called nitisinone. Recommended treatment should begin as early as possible when the condition is diagnosed. Bacterial inhibition assay, such as the Guthrie Test, can screen newborns for FAH deficiency in addition to increased phenylalanine levels. Other diagnostic methods include measurements with tandem mass spectrometry fragmentation. Some individuals require a liver transplant if liver disease progresses into advanced development before dietary treatment begins.

Structure 
A complete FAH genotype has been previously established. All possible bands show two deleterious mutations. The effect of these mutations for the majority of the abnormalities on the FAH mRNA have been analysed. The identification of the gene defects on both alleles enables an initial genotype-phenotype analysis for chronic, subacute and acute HT 1 patients. The FAH gene is located on the chromosome 15q25.1 region and contains 14 exons. It encodes a protein that is 46kDa in height. Multiple isoforms of the protein have been discovered that arose from alternative splicing. The gene is mainly expressed in the liver and the kidney.

References

Further reading

External links 
 GeneReviews/NIH/NCBI/UW entry on Tyrosinemia Type 1, FAH Deficiency, Hepatorenal Tyrosinemia, Hereditary Tyrosinemia Type I, Fumarylacetoacetase Deficiency, Fumarylacetoacetate Hydrolase Deficiency
 

EC 3.7.1